The Rockstore, formerly known as the Grand Odéon, is a 1,000-capacity concert hall located in Montpellier, France. It was classified a monument historique in 2007. Some of the artists that performed at the venue include Blue Öyster Cult, Motörhead, Melissa Etheridge, Hole and Metallica.

References

Concert halls in France